{{DISPLAYTITLE:C8H16O}}
The molecular formula C8H16O may refer to:

 4-Methylcyclohexanemethanol
 Octanal
 Octanones
 2-Octanone
 3-Octanone
 4-Octanone
 1-Octen-3-ol
 Tetramethyltetrahydrofurans
 2,2,5,5-Tetramethyltetrahydrofuran
 3,3,4,4-Tetramethyltetrahydrofuran